The Esiliiga Player of the Year is an annual award given to the best Esiliiga player for his performances in the league.

Esiliiga Player of the Year

See also
Esiliiga

References

External links
Official website 

 
Estonia 2
Lists of Estonian sportspeople
Estonian sports trophies and awards
Association football player non-biographical articles